Book of Shadows is the first solo studio album by heavy metal guitarist Zakk Wylde. The album was first released in 1996 by Geffen Records and was reissued by Spitfire in 1999 with the bonus disc containing "Evil Ways" (the Japanese bonus track from the album's original release), "The Color Green", and "Peddlers of Death" (an acoustic version of a track that features on Black Label Society's Sonic Brew).

Unlike his work with Ozzy Osbourne and Black Label Society, here Zakk Wylde shows a different side to his music; an introspective and mostly acoustic style recalling many of the lighter moments from his previous project, Pride & Glory, as well as classic folk rock artists such as Neil Young.

Promotional singles were released for "Between Heaven and Hell" and "Way Beyond Empty", the latter of which also had an accompanying music video.

"Throwin' It All Away" was written about the death of Shannon Hoon from the band Blind Melon. Hoon and Wylde had lived together and became close friends a few months before he died of a drug overdose.

Track listing 
All songs written and composed by Zakk Wylde.

Disc one
"Between Heaven and Hell" – 3:26
"Sold My Soul" – 4:52 
"Road Back Home" – 5:48
"Way Beyond Empty" – 5:25
"Throwin' It All Away" – 5:47
"What You're Look'n For" – 5:31
"Dead as Yesterday" – 2:51
"Too Numb to Cry" – 2:23
"The Things You Do" – 4:11
"1,000,000 Miles Away" – 6:29
"I Thank You Child" – 4:41

Disc two
"Evil Ways" – 4:13 (original Japanese bonus track)
"The Color Green" – 3:05
"Peddlers of Death" – 5:51 (later re-arranged and re-recorded with Black Label Society for the Sonic Brew album)

Personnel
Zakk Wylde – vocals, guitars, piano, keyboards, harmonica, bass on "1,000,000 Miles Away"
Joe Vitale – drums, keyboards, piano on "I Thank You Child"
James LoMenzo – bass
John Sambataro – additional backing vocals on "Way Beyond Empty"

Production
Produced and recorded by Ron Albert and Howard Albert
Mixed by Bob Clearmountain, assisted by Ryan Freeland
Strings arranged and conducted by Mike Lewis
Recording engineers: Greg Goldman, Ron Albert, Howard Albert, Eric Gobel, Frank Cesarano
Mastered by David J. Donnelly

Management
 Personal manager: Gerry Tolman

References

Zakk Wylde albums
1996 debut albums
Geffen Records albums
Spitfire Records albums